The Argentine ant (Linepithema humile, formerly Iridomyrmex humilis) is an ant native to northern Argentina, Uruguay, Paraguay, Bolivia and southern Brazil. This invasive species was inadvertently introduced by humans on a global scale and has become established in many Mediterranean climate areas, including South Africa, New Zealand, Japan, Easter Island, Australia, Europe, Hawaii, and the continental United States. Argentine ants are significant pests within agricultural and urban settings, and are documented to cause substantial harm to communities of native arthropods, vertebrates, and plants within their invaded range.

Description 
Linepithema humile is a small-bodied (2.2–2.6 mm) ant species, dull light to dark brown in color. Within the invasion zone, ant colonies are large and include many workers and multiple queens. 

Argentine ants are opportunistic with regard to nesting preferences. Colony nests have been found in the ground, in cracks in concrete walls, in spaces between boards and timbers, even among belongings in human dwellings. In natural areas, they generally nest shallowly in loose leaf litter or beneath small stones, due to their poor ability to dig deeper nests. However, if a deeper nesting ant species abandons their nest, Argentine ant colonies will readily take over the space. Because the native habitat for this species is within riparian floodplains, colonies are very sensitive to water infiltration within their nests; if their nests become inundated with water, workers will collect the brood and the entire colony will move to dry ground.

Austrian entomologist Gustav L. Mayr identified the first specimens of Hypoclinea humilis in the vicinity of Buenos Aires, Argentina in 1866. This species was shortly transferred to the genus Iridomyrmex, and finally to Linepithema in the early 1990s.

Distribution 
The native range of Argentine ants is limited to riparian habitats in the lowland areas of the Paraná River drainage, which stretches across northern Argentina, Uruguay, Paraguay, and southern Brazil. Within South America, this species has spread into parts of Chile, Colombia, Ecuador, and Peru. Linepithema humile thrives in Mediterranean climates, and over the past century it has spread to across the globe by human-mediated transport. The species has become established to every continent except Antarctica and includes many oceanic islands. Argentine ants are now found in locations as distant as Chile, western and southern North America, Hawaii, New Zealand, Easter Island, Australia, Japan, Africa, and southern Europe

Global "mega-colony" 
The absence of aggression within Argentine ant colonies was first reported in 1913 by Newell & Barber, who noted "…there is no apparent antagonism between separate colonies of its own kind".
Later studies showed that these "supercolonies" extend across hundreds or thousands of kilometers in different parts of the introduced range, first reported in California in 2000,
then in Europe in 2002,
Japan in 2009,
and Australia in 2010.
Several subsequent studies used genetic, behavioral, and chemical analyses to show that introduced supercolonies on separate continents actually represent a single global supercolony.

The researchers stated that the "enormous extent of this population is paralleled only by human society", and had probably been spread and maintained by human travel.

Behavior 

They have been extraordinarily successful, in part, because different nests of the introduced Argentine ants seldom attack or compete with each other, unlike most other species of ant. In their introduced range, their genetic makeup is so uniform that individuals from one nest can mingle in a neighboring nest without being attacked. Thus, in most of their introduced range, they form 'super-colonies'. "Some ants have an extraordinary social organization, called unicoloniality, whereby individuals mix freely among physically separated nests. This type of social organization is not only a key attribute responsible for the ecological domination of these ants, but also an evolutionary paradox and a potential problem for kin selection theory because relatedness between nest mates is effectively zero."
The 'Very Large Colony', which covers territory from San Diego to beyond San Francisco, may have a population of nearly one trillion individuals.

Conflict does occur between members of different supercolonies. In 1997, UC San Diego researchers observed fighting between different Argentine ants kept in lab, and in 2004 scientists began to map out the boundaries of the different supercolonies that clashed in San Diego. On the border of the 'Very Large Colony' and the 'Lake Hodges Colony' thirty million ants die each year, on a battlefront that covers many miles. While the battles of other ant species generally constitute colony raids lasting a few hours, or skirmishes that occur periodically for a few weeks, Argentine ants clash ceaselessly; the borders of their territory are a site of constant violence and battles can be fought on top of hundreds of dead ants. Fights may be halted by adverse weather such as rain.

In contrast, native populations are genetically more diverse and form colonies that are much smaller than the supercolonies that dominate the introduced range. Colonies living in close proximity are territorial and aggressive toward one another. Argentine ants in their native South America also co-exist with many other species of ants, and do not attain the high population densities that characterize introduced populations.

In a series of experiments, ants of the same colony were isolated and fed different diets. The hydrocarbons from the diet were eventually incorporated into the cuticle of the subjects. Those that had the same diet appeared to recognize one another as kin. Those who had at least some overlap in dietary composition also appeared to react non-aggressively to one another. These interactions contrasts drastically with the groups that fed on completely different sources, such as those who lived off flies and those that fed on grasshoppers. The groups appeared to have incorporated hydrocarbons that were not similar to the others and created an unfamiliar identity cue. These groups reacted violently towards each other. This suggests that dietary factors affect the recognition cues for colony members.

Reproduction and seasonal colony trends 

Like workers in many other ant species, Argentine ant workers are unable to lay reproductive eggs but can direct the development of eggs into reproductive females; the production of males appears to be controlled by the amount of food available to the larvae. Argentine ant colonies almost invariably have many reproductive queens, as many as eight for every 1,000 workers.

The seasonal low occurs in mid-winter, when 90% of a representative colony consists of workers and the remainder of queens, and no reproductive activity and minimal birthing. Eggs are produced in late-winter, nearly all of which hatch into sexual forms by May. Mating occurs after the females emerge. Worker production increases steadily from mid-March to October, after which their numbers are not replenished; thus, their numbers drop steadily over the winter months.

Colonies in the Argentine ant's native habitat are kept within a range of ten to one hundred meters by colonies of interspecific and intraspecific rivals. As the colonies expand, they appear to form fluctuating territory borders, which contract and expand on a seasonal and conditional basis. There is an expansive push outward in the summer months, with a retreating motion in the winter. This has to do with soil moisture and temperature conditions.
At the edges of these borders are either rival L. humile colonies or other obstacles that prevent further expansion, such as an inhospitable environment for nests.

Impact 
The ants are ranked among the world's 100 worst invasive animal species.
In its introduced range, the Argentine ant often displaces most or all native ants and can threaten native invertebrates and even small vertebrates that are not accustomed to defending against the aggressive ants. This can, in turn, imperil other species in the ecosystem, such as native plants that depend on native ants for seed dispersal, or lizards that depend on native ants or invertebrates for food. For example, the recent severe decline in coastal horned lizards in southern California is closely tied to Argentine ants displacing native ant species on which the lizards feed.

Argentine ants sometimes tend aphid, mealybug, and scale insect colonies,
sometimes relocating the parasites to unaffected plants, and their protection of these plant pests from predators and parasitoids can cause problems in agricultural areas.
In return for this protection, the ants benefit by feeding off an excretion known as "honeydew". Thus, when Argentine ants invade an agricultural area, the population densities of these plant parasites can increase followed by an increase in damage to crops.

There is also evidence that the presence of Argentine ant may decrease the number of pollinators that visit natural flowering plants via predation on the larvae of the pollinators.

Pest control 

Argentine ants are a common household pest, often entering structures in search of food or water (particularly during dry or hot weather), or to escape flooded nests during periods of heavy rainfall. When they invade a kitchen, it is not uncommon to see two or three queens foraging along with the workers. Due to the large number of queens, eliminating a single queen does not stop the colony's ability to breed.

Diatomaceous earth has been used to dust trails, feeding sites and nest entrances.

Borate-sucrose water baits are toxic to Argentine ants, when the bait is 25% water, with 0.5–1.0% boric acid or borate salts.

In spring, during a colony's growth phase, protein based baits may be more effective due to much higher demand from the egg-laying queens.

Due to their nesting behavior and presence of numerous queens in each colony, it is generally impractical to spray Argentine ants with pesticides or to use boiling water as with mound building ants. Spraying with pesticides has occasionally stimulated increased egg-laying by the queens, compounding the problem. Pest control usually requires exploiting their omnivorous dietary habits, through use of slow-acting poison bait (e.g. fipronil, hydramethylnon, sulfluramid), which will be carried back to the nest by the workers, eventually killing all the individuals, including the queens. It may take four to five days to eradicate a colony in this manner.

Researchers from the University of California, Irvine, have developed a way to use the scent of Argentine ants against them. The exoskeletons of the ants are covered with a hydrocarbon-laced secretion. They made a compound that is different, but similar, to the one that coats the ants. If the chemical is applied to an ant, the other members of the colony will kill it. The chemical method may be effective in combination with other methods.

Another approach for a large scale control of the Argentine ant has been proposed by researchers from Japan, who showed that it is possible to disrupt its trails with synthetic pheromones. This has been confirmed in various later trials by a New Zealand-led team in Hawaii and by researchers from Victoria University of Wellington who showed that this approach is beneficial for other local ant species.

See also 
 Linepithema humile virus 1, a virus carried by Argentine ants

References

External links 

  with information on habits, habitat and prevention
 
 
 

Dolichoderinae
Agricultural pest insects
Household pest insects
Insects described in 1868
Hymenoptera of New Zealand
Ants of New Zealand